Johan Suykens is a full professor from KU Leuven in Belgium. He was named a Fellow of the Institute of Electrical and Electronics Engineers (IEEE) in 2015 for developing least squares support vector machines.

References

Fellow Members of the IEEE
Living people
Belgian electrical engineers
Year of birth missing (living people)
Place of birth missing (living people)
21st-century Belgian engineers
Academic staff of KU Leuven